Dangelo Stéfano Valencia Chávez (born 16 May 1999) is a Peruvian footballer who plays as a full-back for Peruvian Segunda División side Sport Chavelines.

Career

Club career
Valencia joined Carlos A. Mannucci from Deportivo Municipal. He got his professional debut for Carlos A. Mannucci in the Peruvian Primera División on 24 March 2019 against Universidad de San Martín. Valencia was in the starting lineup but was replaced by Diego Manicero in the half time. He made a total of six appearances during the 2019 season.

On 1 April 2021, Valencia joined Peruvian Segunda División side Deportivo Llacuabamba. On 1 March 2022, he moved to fellow league club Sport Chavelines.

References

External links
 
 

Living people
1999 births
Association football defenders
Peruvian footballers
Footballers from Lima
Peruvian Primera División players
Peruvian Segunda División players
Deportivo Municipal footballers
Carlos A. Mannucci players